Sergio Aragoneses Almeida (born 1 February 1977) is a Spanish former footballer who played as a goalkeeper.

His professional career, mainly associated with Tenerife, saw him appear in 180 Segunda División games over nine seasons. He added 87 matches in La Liga, also representing in the competition Atlético Madrid and Getafe.

Club career
Aragoneses was born in O Porriño, Galicia. After unsuccessfully emerging through RC Celta de Vigo's youth academy he went on to represent local Sporting Guardés and Pontevedra CF, moving to CD Tenerife for the 2000–01 season and helping the Canary Islands club return to La Liga immediately.

Aragoneses made his top flight debut in 2001–02 (in a 0–2 home loss against Deportivo Alavés), and went on to have unassuming spells with Madrid's Getafe CF and Atlético, which loaned him to Getafe as well. In 2005–06 he signed for second division side Elche CF, being diagnosed with testicular cancer shortly after; he missed a great part of the campaign, but was still able to finish it.

After joining Hércules CF – also in the Valencian Community and in the second level – in 2006, Aragoneses was again diagnosed with the ailment, this time being forced to undergo chemotherapy. He eventually recovered completely, and returned to the team's lineups.

In early 2008, Aragoneses was suspended by coach Andoni Goikoetxea after statements by the player which were seen as "an act of indiscipline", being eventually released. He signed almost immediately with CD Numancia, which had lost first-choice Jacobo to a severe knee injury.

In July 2008, after having made no official appearances for the Soria-based club, Aragoneses returned to Tenerife after a five-year absence. After winning the battle for first-choice with Luis García, however, he was sidelined until the end of the season with a case of acute pancreatitis; once again he fully recovered, being the undisputed starter in 2009–10's top flight (all matches and minutes in an eventual relegation, only certified however in the last round).

References

External links

1977 births
Living people
Spanish footballers
Footballers from O Porriño
Association football goalkeepers
La Liga players
Segunda División players
Segunda División B players
Tercera División players
Celta de Vigo B players
Pontevedra CF footballers
CD Tenerife players
Getafe CF footballers
Atlético Madrid footballers
Elche CF players
Hércules CF players
CD Numancia players
Cádiz CF players
CD Marino players